is a railway station in the city of Yokote, Akita Prefecture,  Japan, operated by JR East.

Lines

Station layout
The station consists of an island platform serving two tracks. A level crossing connects the platform to the station building located south of the platforms. A waiting room is also located at the centre of the platform.  The station is unattended.

Platforms

History
Ainono Station opened on October 10, 1920, as a station on the Japanese Government Railways (JGR), serving the village of Sannai, Akita. The JGR became the Japan National Railways (JNR) after World War II. The station was absorbed into the JR East network upon the privatization of the JNR on April 1, 1987. A new station building was completed in July 1996.

Surrounding area

See also
List of railway stations in Japan

References

External links

 JR East Station information 

Railway stations in Japan opened in 1920
Railway stations in Akita Prefecture
Kitakami Line
Yokote, Akita